Consort Ji may refer to:

Consort Ji (Hong Taiji) ( 17th century), concubine of Hong Taiji
Consort Ji, of the Wang clan (1846–1905), concubine of the Xianfeng Emperor

See also
Consort Qi (disambiguation)
Many consorts in ancient (pre-Qin) China were surnamed Ji, like Li Ji (concubine), Fan Ji, Xia Ji, etc.